A la Reconquista is the third and final studio album by Héctor & Tito and their best known album as a duo, winning Rap Album of the Year at the 2003 Latin Music Awards. Later albums are just compilations of their best songs. Eliel and Luny Tunes were the main producers of this album.

Track listing

References 

Héctor & Tito albums
2002 albums
Albums produced by Luny Tunes
Albums produced by Noriega